This is the full discography of American singer, songwriter and record producer Ryan Tedder.

As performer

Singles

As lead artist

As featured artist

Guest appearances

Songwriting discography

Production discography

References

 
Country music discographies
Discographies of American artists 
Discography
Hip hop discographies
Lists of songs by songwriters 
Pop music discographies 
Production discographies
Rock music discographies